Lesobeng Airport  is an airstrip serving the community of Lesobeng, in the Thaba-Tseka District of Lesotho.

The runway sits atop a ridge with steep drops at either end. Check location carefully, as airport coordinates here disagree with other online references.

See also

Transport in Lesotho
List of airports in Lesotho

References

External links
OpenStreetMap - Lesobeng

 Google Earth

Airports in Lesotho